We Own the Night may refer to:
We Own the Night (film), a 2007 film
We Own the Night (EP), a 2013 EP by Jim Jones
"We Own the Night" (Selena Gomez & the Scene song), 2011
"We Own the Night" (Tiësto and Wolfgang Gartner song), 2012
"We Own the Night" (The Wanted song), 2013
"We Own the Night", a 2018 single by Chancellor and Moti
Fiesta, a 2014 single by Emii, also known as "We Own the Night"

See also
"We Owned the Night", a 2011 song by Lady Antebellum